George Raymond Johnson (7 February 1840 – 25 November 1898) was an architect who practiced in late 19th century Melbourne, Australia, known for designing numerous important buildings, especially town halls and theatres.

Biography
Johnson was born in Southgate, England (then a part of Middlesex) and at age 13 began working with George Hall, Midland Railway architect. At 19 he moved to London, presumably to continue his architectural career. On 24 July 1862 he married Emma Louise Wood and, nine days later, the couple embarked on a journey of emigration to Queensland. In 1867, Johnson moved to Melbourne, where he produced most of his major works. In 1898, while at sea on return to Melbourne from Perth, Western Australia, Johnson contracted sepsis, and died.

Architectural works 
Johnson is known today for the design of a number of town halls across Victoria, notably the impressive Collingwood Town Hall, probably the most elaborate of the grand towered Second Empire style town halls that characterised the boom years of Melbourne in the 1880s, but he achieved contemporary renown for his theatres in Melbourne, Sydney and Adelaide (perhaps as many as fifteen), now all demolished. Johnson's greatest contemporary acclaim came from his design for the extensive northern additions to Reed & Barnes's grand 1880 Exhibition Building for the Centennial Exhibition of 1888, removed soon after the Exhibition.

Johnson's major works, notably all the town halls and the theatres, were Renaissance Revival in style, and its variations including Free Classical, Italianate, Second Empire or Mannerist. Many were designed "with bold and rich character from Johnson's mannerist palette, an idiom in which he was a master." Amongst his many smaller projects such as shops, houses and hotels, some are no doubt Gothic in character, but his largest project in this idiom was the first buildings for the Hospital for Incurables, now the Austin Hospital, (1881, demolished) which were Venetian Gothic in polychrome brick.

A selection of Johnson's notable buildings are listed below. For a complete list of known works, see the database compiled by Johnson's descendant, architect Peter Johnson, included in Hannan (2006).

References 

British neoclassical architects
1898 deaths
1840 births
Victorian (Australia) architects
English emigrants to Australia
19th-century English architects